Plata is an unincorporated community in Presidio County, Texas, on Texas Farm Road 169 approximately 25 miles south of the county seat of Marfa. The population at the 2000 census was 37.

Plata is Spanish for "silver."

Education
Plata is zoned to schools in the Marfa Independent School District.

Climate
This area has a large amount of sunshine year round due to its stable descending air and high pressure.  According to the Köppen Climate Classification system, Plata has a desert climate, abbreviated BWh on climate maps.

References

External links

Unincorporated communities in Presidio County, Texas
Unincorporated communities in Texas